is a 2,603m mountain on the border of Chino and Koumi of Nagano in Japan. This mountain belongs to Northern Yatsugatake Volcanic Group.

Description
Mount Neishi is a stratovolcano. This mountain is a part of the Yatsugatake-Chūshin Kōgen Quasi-National Park.

Access 
 Tatsunokan Bus Stop of Suwa Bus

Gallery

References
 Ministry of Environment of Japan
 Official Home Page of the Geographical Survey Institute in Japan
  ‘Yatsugatake, Tateshina, Utsukushigahara, Kirigamine 2008, Shobunsha

Neishi
Neishi